In Greek mythology, Cleocharia (Ancient Greek: Κλεοχαρείας Kleokhareia) was a naiad of Laconia who later on became the queen-consort of King Lelex of Lelegia. She was the ancestress of the Spartan royal family and gave birth to Eurotas (presumably named after his grandfather). Eurotas had a daughter named Sparta, who married Lacedaemon. The latter named the city of Sparta after his wife. However, the city's name would also be his own, as it was called either Lacedaemon or Sparta interchangeably. 

In some accounts, Lelex's two children were Myles and Polycaon possibly by Cleocharia. In this account, Myles was the father of Eurotas instead.

Notes

References 

 Apollodorus, The Library with an English Translation by Sir James George Frazer, F.B.A., F.R.S. in 2 Volumes, Cambridge, MA, Harvard University Press; London, William Heinemann Ltd. 1921. . Online version at the Perseus Digital Library. Greek text available from the same website
 Pausanias, Description of Greece with an English Translation by W.H.S. Jones, Litt.D., and H.A. Ormerod, M.A., in 4 Volumes. Cambridge, MA, Harvard University Press; London, William Heinemann Ltd. 1918. . Online version at the Perseus Digital Library
 Pausanias, Graeciae Descriptio. 3 vols. Leipzig, Teubner. 1903.  Greek text available at the Perseus Digital Library.

Naiads

Nymphs
Queens in Greek mythology
Laconian characters in Greek mythology
Laconian mythology